Syllepis is a genus of moths of the family Crambidae described by Felipe Poey in 1832.

Species
Syllepis aurora Munroe, 1959
Syllepis hortalis (Walker, 1859)
Syllepis latimarginalis Munroe, 1970
Syllepis marialis Poey, 1832
Syllepis religiosa Munroe, 1963
Syllepis semifuneralis Munroe, 1970
Syllepis triangulifera Munroe, 1970

References

Spilomelinae
Crambidae genera
Taxa named by Felipe Poey